Leandro Mário Baldé Sanca (born 4 January 2000) is a Portuguese professional footballer who plays as a forward for Primeira Liga club Famalicão, on loan from Spezia.

Club career
On 9 June 2020, Sanca signed a professional contract with Braga until 2024. Sanca made his professional debut with Braga in a 4-0 Primeira Liga win over C.D. Aves on 7 July 2020.

On 30 August 2021, he signed a 3-year contract with Spezia in Italy and was at the same time loaned to Casa Pia for the 2021–22 season.

Upon his return from loan, Sanca made his Serie A debut for Spezia on 31 August 2022 against Juventus.

On 13 January 2023, he joined F.C. Famalicão on loan.

Personal life
Born in Portugal, Sanca is of Bissau-Guinean descent.

References

External links

Zero Zero Profile

2000 births
Portuguese people of Bissau-Guinean descent
Living people
Footballers from Lisbon
Portuguese footballers
Association football forwards
S.C. Braga players
Associação Académica de Coimbra – O.A.F. players
Spezia Calcio players
Casa Pia A.C. players
F.C. Famalicão players
Primeira Liga players
Liga Portugal 2 players
Campeonato de Portugal (league) players
Serie A players
Portuguese expatriate footballers
Expatriate footballers in Italy
Portuguese expatriate sportspeople in Italy